Ralja can refer to several locations in Serbia:

 Ralja (Sopot), a village in the city municipality of Sopot, city of Belgrade
 Ralja (Smederevo), a village in the city of Smederevo

or:

 Ralja (river)

Serbo-Croatian place names